{{DISPLAYTITLE:C26H36N2O3}}
The molecular formula C26H36N2O3 (molar mass: 424.576 g/mol) may refer to:

 Devapamil
 Sergolexole (LY-281,067)

Molecular formulas